Alla is a Russian and Ukrainian female given name.

Since the name is also spread among Tatars, there is some speculation that the name has its origin in the pre-Islamic goddess Allat. The name Alla is also widespread in Iceland.

People
Alla Ablaberdyeva (born 1953), Russian singer
Alla Aleksandrovska (born 1948), Ukrainian politician
Alla Alekseyeva (born 1934), Russian rower
Alla Bayanova (1914–2011), Russian singer
Alla Beknazarova (born 1984), Ukrainian ice dancer
Alla Cherkasova (born 1989), Ukrainian wrestler
Alla Demidova (born 1936), Russian actress
Alla Dzhioyeva (born 1949), South Ossetian politician
Alla Gerber (born 1932), Russian journalist
Alla Gryaznova (born 1937), Russian economist
Alla Hasanova (born 1970), Azerbaijani volleyball player
Alla Ilchun (1926–1989), Kazakhstani model
Alla Kazanskaya (1920–2008), Russian actress
Alla Korot (born 1970), Ukrainian-American actress 
Alla Kravets (born 1973), Ukrainian volleyball player
Alla Kudryavtseva (born 1987), Russian tennis player
Alla Nazimova (1879–1945), Russian actress
Alla Osipenko (born 1932), Russian ballet dancer
Alla Pugacheva (born 1949), Russian singer
Alla Shekhovtsova (born 1964), Russian figure skating judge
Alla Sidorovskaya (born 1983), Russian footballer
Alla Sizova (1939–2014), Russian ballet dancer
Alla Sosnitskaya (born 1997), Russian gymnast
Alla O. Starostina, Ukrainian economist
Alla Tsuper (born 1979), Belarusian skier
Alla Vazhenina (born 1983), Kazakh weightlifter
Alla Yaroshinskaya (born 1953), Ukrainian politician
Alla Zahaikevych (born 1966), Ukrainian composer

References

Russian feminine given names
Slavic feminine given names